The Cambridge History of English and American Literature is an encyclopedia of literary criticism that was published by Cambridge University Press between 1907 and 1921. Edited and written by an international panel of 171 leading scholars and thinkers of the early twentieth century, its 18 volumes comprise 303 chapters and more than 11,000 pages. The English-literature chapters begin with Old English poetry and end with the late Victorian era. Coverage of American literature ranges from colonial and revolutionary periods through the early twentieth century.

A. W. Ward and A. R. Waller were the joint editors-in-chief of the 14 volumes (with an additional index volume) on English literature. William Peterfield Trent, John Erskine, Stuart Sherman and Carl Van Doren were the editors-in-chief of the 4 volumes on American literature. The 4 volumes on American literature were published in Cambridge, England by the Cambridge University Press and in New York City by G. P. Putnam's Sons.

Bartleby.com published the complete work online in the year 2000, dividing it into over 5,600 files, and including indexes by chapter, bibliography, and chapter author. It contains biographical information and bibliographies on major individuals and literary movements. It is "considered the most important work of literary history and criticism ever published", its "topics ranging from poetry, fiction, drama and essays to history, theology and political writing." The encyclopedia's scope is vast, encompassing "a wide selection of writing on orators, humorists, poets, newspaper columnists, religious leaders, economists, Native Americans, song writers, and even non-English writing, such as Yiddish and Creole".

References

External links

The Cambridge History of English and American Literature: an Encyclopedia in Eighteen Volumes on Bartleby.com
The Cambridge History of English and American Literature: An Encyclopedia in Eighteen Volumes on the website of the University of Pennsylvania

1907 non-fiction books
1921 non-fiction books
British non-fiction literature
History of literature in the United Kingdom
History of English and American Literature
American non-fiction books
Reference works in the public domain
Free ebooks
History of literature in the United States